Pending LRT station (pronounced "pern ding") is an elevated Light Rail Transit (LRT) station on the Bukit Panjang LRT line in Bukit Panjang, Singapore, opposite the Bukit Panjang Community Club.

Etymology

The station is located along Pending Road. Pending refers to a large "waist buckle" in Malay.

References

External links

Railway stations in Singapore opened in 1999
Bukit Panjang
LRT stations of Bukit Panjang LRT Line
Light Rail Transit (Singapore) stations